Clinical Practice in Pediatric Psychology is a quarterly peer-reviewed academic journal published by the American Psychological Association on behalf of APA Division 54. It covers all aspects of pediatric psychology. The inaugural editors-in-chief were Jennifer Shroff Pendley (Nemours Foundation/Alfred I. duPont Hospital for Children) and W. Douglas Tynan (Nemours Health and Prevention Services). The current editor-in-chief is Christina Duncan (West Virginia University). The journal was established in 2013 and is abstracted and indexed in PsycINFO and Scopus.

References

External links

Clinical psychology journals
American Psychological Association academic journals
English-language journals
Quarterly journals
Publications established in 2013
2013 establishments in the United States